John Webbe (c. 1532 – 1571) was an English politician.

Webbe was Mayor of Salisbury from 1560 to 1561. He was a Member (MP) of the Parliament of England for Salisbury in 1559.

References

1530s births
1571 deaths
English MPs 1559
Mayors of Salisbury